Merton Community School District, or Merton Community Schools, is a school district headquartered in Merton Village, Wisconsin. It operates grades K-8.

It includes most of Merton Village as well as sections of Merton Town and Lisbon Town. It feeds into the Arrowhead High School District.

History

Prior to 1969 the Merton district took the junior high school students of the Lake Five School District, which operated a two room school; as of that year there were plans to divide the Lake Five district and close its school.

In 1970 an elementary school received an addition. It had a cost of $137,000.

In 2019 the district installed solar panels.

In the period 2019 to 2022, enrollment increased by 69, due to out-of-district students enrolling and additional housing developments. 58 of those students were added beginning in 2021.

Schools
 Merton Intermediate School
 Merton Primary School
 Becca Stein served as principal until 2023, when she submitted her resignation. There were parents who were in favor of her remaining, and who argued that she was unfairly convinced to resign. There were other individuals who stated that there were issues with the leadership during her principalship. The school board did not explain the resignation.

References

External links
 Merton Community Schools

School districts in Wisconsin
Education in Waukesha County, Wisconsin